John Pattison (1851-1918) was the Dean of Ardfert from 1916 to 1918.

Pattison was educated at Trinity College, Dublin and  ordained in 1884. He began his ecclesiastical career with a curacy at Kiltallagh. He was Rector  of Kilcolman from 1886 to 1892; and then of Listowel until his death. He was Precentor of Ardfert Cathedral from  1905 to 1916.

He died on 15 August 1918.

References

Alumni of Trinity College Dublin
Deans of Ardfert
1851 births
1906 deaths